"The Big Sky" is a song by English singer-songwriter Kate Bush. Released in 1986, it was the fourth and final single to be released from her No. 1 album Hounds of Love. The single became another Top 40 hit for Bush, peaking at No. 37 on the UK Singles Chart.

The 7" single was released as the "Special Single Mix", which includes a different intro and edited dubs before the final refrain. This version appears as a B-side on the 1994 CD single "The Red Shoes". The 12" single includes an extended version of "The Big Sky" called the "Meteorological Mix". A limited edition 7" picture disc was also released. 

The song is about remembering some of the simple pleasures enjoyed as children that most no longer find the time for, such as spending the afternoon looking at the sky, watching the clouds take on shapes.

The B-side is a song called "Not This Time". The 12" single includes an additional B-side, "The Morning Fog", a track on the Hounds of Love album. The music video was directed by Bush herself. In 1987, "The Big Sky" was nominated for Best Female Video at the MTV Video Music Awards.

Track listing

Personnel
Kate Bush – vocals, Fairlight CMI, piano
Paddy Bush – didgeridoo
Alan Murphy – guitar
Martin Glover – bass guitar
Charlie Morgan – drums, handclaps
Del Palmer – LinnDrum programming, handclaps
Morris Pert – percussion

Charts

References

Kate Bush songs
1985 songs
1986 singles
Songs written by Kate Bush
EMI Records singles